The Noise We Make is the first commercial solo release by Chris Tomlin through sixstepsrecords in 2001.

Critical reception

The Noise We Make was generally well received by four music critics.

At Christianity Today, Russ Breimeier gave a positive review of the album, stating that "Contrary to other recent worship releases, The Noise We Make is a pretty good album, filled with mostly original praise songs and a few repeats." In addition, Breimeier says that even "Though I can't rave about this first album, The Noise We Make offers enough to pique my interest for future songs and recordings from Chris Tomlin." Mary Brows of Cross Rhythms rated the album nine squares out of ten, writing that "Each song is excellent" because it "powerfully stimulates" her faith and calling it "A must for every CD library!" Also, Brows states that Tomlin's "debut album has a wonderful sound, ranging from intimate worship to vigorous praise, celebration and love to our Creator." At CCM Magazine, Mike Fernandez rated the album three stars out of five, stating that it is "an impressive debut" from Tomlin because it "sonically sounds better with each listen." Furthermore, Fernandez writes that "On The Noise We Make, there are songs to sing along with and there are songs to contemplate." Zik Johnson of The Phantom Tollbooth rated the album four out of five tocks, saying that it is "as a professional, well-produced project suitable for personal worship times and group settings."

Track listing

Sources:

Personnel 
 Chris Tomlin – lead vocals, backing vocals, acoustic guitar
 Nathan Nockels – keyboards, acoustic guitar, harmonica, backing vocals
 Jack Parker – acoustic guitar
 Rivers Rutherford – acoustic guitar on "Captured" and "This is Our God"
 Gary Burnette – electric guitars, bluegrass section
 Pat Malone – bass 
 Steve Brewster – drums
 Christy Nockels – backing vocals
 Matt Redman – additional lead vocals on "The Wonderful Cross"

Choir
 Louie Giglio
 Christy Nockels
 Nathan Nockels
 Chris Tomlin
 J.D. Walt

Singers on "Forever"
 Darwin Hobbs
 Leanne Palmore
 Jovaun Woods

Production 
 Nathan Nockels – producer 
 Chris Tomlin – producer 
 Louie Giglio – executive producer 
 Aaron Swihart – engineer
 Chris Mara – assistant engineer
 Tim O'Dell – assistant engineer
 Dark Horse Recording Studio (Franklin, Tennessee) – recording location
 Small Change Studios (Nashville, Tennessee) – recording location, additional overdubs
 Tom Laune – mixing
 Bridgeway Studios (Nashville, Tennessee) – mixing location
 Dave Lynch – vocal recording (Matt Redman's vocals)
 ICC Studios (Eastbourne, England) – recording location (Matt Redman's vocals)
 Les Moir – producer (Matt Redman's vocals)
 Debbie Porter – photography
 Origin Design (Houston, Texas) – visuals

References 

Chris Tomlin albums
2001 albums